Mario Avellaneda Soriano (born 12 November 1974 in Granollers, Spain) is a Spanish race walker.

Achievements

References

Profile

1974 births
Living people
Sportspeople from Granollers
Spanish male racewalkers
Athletes from Catalonia